Amanda Clark (born March 26, 1982) is an American sports sailor. She was born in Southampton, New York.

In 2002, Clark won the ICSA Women’s Singlehanded National Championship in 2002.

She competed at the 2008 Summer Olympics in Beijing, People's Republic of China in the women's 470. Sailing alongside Sara Mergenthaler the pair finished in 12th position.

At the 2012 Summer Olympics, she competed in the women's 470 class with Sarah Lihan; the pair finished ninth.

Significant sailing achievements: Ranked No. 1 on the U.S. Sailing Team - 470 Women (2005-2008); Team Alternate/470 Women - 2004 Olympic Games; At 15, youngest female sailor to join the US Sailing Team in the Europe class

References

1982 births
Living people
American female sailors (sport)
Olympic sailors of the United States
Daughters of the American Revolution
Sailors at the 2012 Summer Olympics – 470
Daughters of the American Revolution people
Connecticut College Camels sailors
21st-century American women